The Swatch FIVB World Tour 2012 is an international beach volleyball competition.

The 2012 tour consists of 9 tournaments with both genders and 5 separate gender tournaments.

Grand Slam
There are six Grand Slam tournaments and one World Championships. These events give a higher number of points and more money than the rest of the tournaments.
Shanghai, China – Shanghai Grand Slam presented by Jinshan Xinchen, April 30–May 6, 2012
Beijing, China – Beijing Grand Slam, 7–13 May 2012
Moscow, Russia – Moscow Grand Slam, 6–12 June 2012
Rome, Italy – Rome Grand Slam, 12–17 June 2012
Gstaad, Switzerland – 1 to 1 Energy Grand Slam, 2–8 July 2012
Berlin, Germany – Smart Grand Slam Berlin 2012, 10–15 July 2012
Klagenfurt, Austria – A1 presented by Volksbank, 16–22 July 2012
Stare Jabłonki, Poland – Mazury Orlen Grand Slam, 13–19 August 2012

Tournament results

Women

Men

Medal table by country

References

External links

2012 Swatch FIVB World Tour – tour calendar at FIVB.org
Beachvolley at Swatch.com

 

2012 in beach volleyball
2012